One Call was a boy band featuring Justin "JJ" Thorne, Anthony "AG" Gamlieli, Chris Moy, and Jose Bordonada. Johnny Wright—a music executive who has managed successful groups such as Backstreet Boys, 'NSync, and the Jonas Brothers—brought the band together from all over the country. Rodney "Darkchild" Jerkins became their producer. Their dances are choreographed by Laurianne Gibson.

Bordonada and Gemlieli left the group in 2011, and the group subsequently disbanded. They also were dropped by Jive Records before their closure, and their debut album was canceled.

Members

Anthony "A.G" Gamlieli is from Graham, Pierce County, Washington. Growing up, Gamlieli had a dancing family. His parents owned a dance studio, and he and his sister, Amalitta, were both heavily involved in dance competitions in and around the Seattle area. In 2007, he scored seventh place in Star Power Talent's Seattle competition under the category of 13-15 solo, third place with his partner Chelsea Stout in 13-15 Duo/Trio, and first place in Teen Mister, all under G-Force, a dance team that came from his parents' dance school, The Elite School of Dance. He was also in a band prior to being discovered by Johnny Wright. Upon Gamlieli's departure, the previous group fell apart.
Justin "J.J" Thorne is an actor, dancer, producer, and musician from Los Angeles, CA. He was born in Canyon Country, CA to director Rich Thorne. Justin was also a member of NLT, along with Glee'''s Kevin McHale, and also toured with The Pussycat Dolls. Justin has made numerous appearances in various films and television shows as an extra, such as Disney's That's So Raven, Dr. Dolittle 3, and Will & Grace. He was also a part of Learn to Hip Hop: Volumes 2&3 as himself, as well as appearing briefly with the rest NLT in Bratz: The Movie.
Christopher Nelson Moy is from the Bronx, NY. He and fellow One Call Member, José Bordonada were a part of the MTV series "Making Menudo", which was about their band. Chris and Jose then formed two-fifths of the Latin Boy band by the name of Menudo.
José Bordonada is from Manati, Puerto Rico. A self-confessed "Talent Show Kid", has been singing since he was 5 and started dancing when he was 11. Former member of the boy band Menudo. 

Music videos
The song BlackLight, one of their biggest hits, was made into a video in which stars from many television shows were in. The video took three days to perform, in which they practiced eight to ten hours a day. Kendall Jenner from Keeping Up With The Kardashians, Ashley Benson from Pretty Little Liars, and Kevin McHale from Glee'' among others star in this video. One Call states they had so many other stars in order to make it "fun" for the viewers.

Other tours

Circus
One Call opened for Britney Spears in 2009 for her Circus tour. They opened nine shows for Britney. One Call opened six shows on the East Coast and three shows in Madison Square Garden. They did the Circus tour after being a band for only six months.

References

American pop music groups
American boy bands